Sitamarhi-Bhitthamore Road is a section of the National Highway 104 (India). It is also a part of the Ram-Janki Path (Ramayan circuit). This road is important for religious reasons as it connects via Bhitthamore(India) to Janakpur which houses a 200-years-old Janki Temple with Sitamarhi—considered to be the birthplace of Goddess Sita. It is the lifeline road for the local towns and villages residing near the Indo-Nepal border. This road keeps on making headlines of news due to the floods & international border sharing with Nepal.

References 

Roads in India
National Highways in Bihar
Transport in Sitamarhi